Pete Sampras defeated the defending champion Patrick Rafter in a rematch of the previous year's final, 7–6(9–7), 6–3 to win the singles tennis title at the 1999 Cincinnati Masters.

Seeds 
The top eight seeds received a bye to the second round.

  Pete Sampras (champion)
  Patrick Rafter (final)
  Andre Agassi (semifinals)
  Yevgeny Kafelnikov (semifinals)
  Tim Henman (quarterfinals)
  Gustavo Kuerten (quarterfinals)
  Richard Krajicek (quarterfinals)
  Álex Corretja (second round)
  Todd Martin (second round)
  Carlos Moyà (first round)
  Tommy Haas (third round)
  Nicolas Kiefer (third round)
  Thomas Enqvist (second round)
  Álbert Costa (second round)
  Nicolás Lapentti (third round)
  Thomas Johansson (first round, retired)

Draw

Finals

Top half

Section 1

Section 2

Bottom half

Section 3

Section 4

External links 
 Main draw

Singles